Pir Aftab Hussain Shah Jilani is a Pakistani politician who was a member of the National Assembly of Pakistan from 2002 to 2013.

Political career
He was elected to the National Assembly of Pakistan from Constituency NA-226 (Mirpurkhas-I) as a candidate of Pakistan Peoples Party (PPP) in 2002 Pakistani general election. He received 63,638 votes and defeated Rais Ahmed Khan, a candidate of Muttahida Qaumi Movement (MQM).

He was re-elected to the National Assembly from Constituency NA-226 (Mirpurkhas-cum-Umerkot-I) as a candidate of PPP in 2008 Pakistani general election. He received 78,543 votes and defeated Khursheed Ahmed Siddiqui, a candidate of MQM.

References

Living people
Year of birth missing (living people)
Place of birth missing (living people)
Pakistani MNAs 2008–2013
Pakistani MNAs 2002–2007